The  was the 10th edition of the Japan Film Professional Awards. It awarded the best of film in 2000. The ceremony took place on April 14, 2001 at Shin-Bungeiza in Tokyo.

Awards 
Best Film: Charisma
Best Director: Junji Sakamoto (Face)
Best Actress: Rena Tanaka (First Love)
Best Actor: Kōji Chihara (Hysteric)
Best New Encouragement: Yūsuke Iseya (Kinpatsu no Sōgen)
Best New Encouragement: Hitomi Miwa (Crazy Lips)
Best New Director: Akira Ogata (Dokuritsu Shōnen Gasshōdan)
Special: Hiroyuki Okiura (Jin-Roh: The Wolf Brigade)
Movie King of 90's: Takashi Miike
Movie King of 90's: Rikkyo University S.P.P.

10 best films
 Charisma (Kiyoshi Kurosawa)
 Face (Junji Sakamoto)
 Tōkyō Gomi Onna (Ryūichi Hiroki)
 Hysteric (Takahisa Zeze)
 First Love (Tetsuo Shinohara)
 Nagisa (Masaru Konuma)
 By Player (Kaneto Shindo)
 Futei no Kisetsu (Ryūichi Hiroki)

References

External links
  

Japan Film Professional Awards
2001 in Japanese cinema
Japan Film Professional Awards
April 2001 events in Japan